"Dancing Until Midnight" is a song by Australian pop group Pseudo Echo. The song was released on 25 June 1984 as the third single from their debut studio album, Autumnal Park (1984). The song peaked at number 53 on the Australian Kent Music Report in July 1984.

Track listing 
7" (EMI-1304) 
Side A "Dancing Until Midnight" - 4:05
Side B "Scripts" - 3:22

Charts

References 

1984 songs
1984 singles
Pseudo Echo songs
Song recordings produced by John Punter